The Four-man competition at the IBSF World Championships 2021 was held on 13 and 14 February 2021.

Results
The first two runs were held on 13 February at 15:49 and the last two runs on 14 February at 15:00.

References

Four-man